O-774 is a classical cannabinoid derivative which acts as a potent agonist for the cannabinoid receptors, with a Ki of 0.6 nM at CB1, and very potent cannabinoid effects in animal studies.

See also
 AM-2232
 O-1057
 O-1812

References

Benzochromenes
Cannabinoids